MacArthur Lane (March 16, 1942 – May 4, 2019) was an American professional football player who was a running back in the National Football League (NFL) for eleven seasons, from 1968 to 1978 for the St. Louis Cardinals, Green Bay Packers, and Kansas City Chiefs.

Born and raised in Oakland, California, Lane was named after United States Army General Douglas MacArthur.
Lane graduated from its Fremont High School, where he was all-city in football honors. He worked for several years in a machine shop, then played his first season of college football at Merritt College and transferred to Utah State University in 1965. Known as "Truck" in Logan, Lane was a linebacker as a sophomore and moved to running back as a junior, and averaged 6.9 yards per carry for his final two seasons.

Lane was the 13th overall selection of the 1968 NFL/AFL Draft, taken by the St. Louis Cardinals. 
He was a Pro Bowl selection in  when he led the NFL in rushing touchdowns with  
Despite personal statistical success with the Cardinals, Lane’s time was marred by tension with head coaches Charley Winner and later Bob Hollway as well as team owner Bill Bidwill, mostly over disagreements regarding Lane’s value. Playing the 1971 season without signing a contract, he commented that the then-rotund Bidwill had "all his money in his stomach" and was suspended by the team.

After four seasons in St. Louis, Lane was traded to Green Bay in February 1972 for  Teamed in the backfield with John Brockington, the Packers won the division and returned to the playoffs for the first time since 1967. Under new head coach Bart Starr in 1975, Lane was traded to Kansas City in July for a future draft pick. He played his final four seasons with the Chiefs, and during the 1976 season, Lane led the NFL in receptions with 66. He recorded 144 yards rushing on October 1, 1978 in a 13-28 loss to the Buffalo Bills at age 36 years 199 days, a record that still stands for the oldest player with 100+ yards rushing in an NFL game.

Lane was inducted in the Utah State University Athletics Hall of Fame in 2008. He died on May 4, 2019, aged 77.

Upon his death, lifelong friend Raymond Chester said “Mac was one of those guys that everybody loved. He was smart as a whip, kindhearted and generous. As an athlete, he had to be one of the top ten greatest high school athletes ever in the Bay Area.”

References

External links

1942 births
2019 deaths
Players of American football from Oakland, California
American football running backs
Utah State Aggies football players
St. Louis Cardinals (football) players
Green Bay Packers players
Kansas City Chiefs players
National Conference Pro Bowl players